Jacob Young (born 2 February 1993) is a British Conservative Party politician serving as Assistant Government Whip since September 2022. He was elected as the member of Parliament (MP) for Redcar at the 2019 general election. He is the first Conservative MP to represent the constituency.

Early life and career
Young was born in Middlesbrough, North Yorkshire as the son of Terrence Anthony Young and Elizabeth Anne Young. He grew up in a working-class family in Middlesbrough, and has six siblings. Young attended Macmillan Academy, and then studied at Redcar & Cleveland College and the TTE Technical Institute. After this, he obtained a Higher National Certificate in chemical engineering at Teesside University. Whilst at university, he joined the Conservative Party.

He then trained as an apprentice technician and worked as a process operator for Chemoxy International Ltd. Young later became a lead technician for a petrochemicals company.

Through his church, Young was involved in a food bank in Middlesbrough and a centre of the charity Christians Against Poverty. He described the approach towards poverty of the latter as a politically formative experience, "Christians Against Poverty was more about teaching people how to budget using the money that they had and how to pay back some of their debt over an extended period of time. That attitude drew me to the Conservatives – the idea that if you work hard and you want to succeed that you can."

Political career
Young stood as the Conservative candidate in the Redcar constituency at the 2015 general election, but finished in fourth place behind the Labour Party, Liberal Democrat, and UKIP candidates. He campaigned for Brexit prior to the 2016 United Kingdom European Union membership referendum. At the 2017 general election, Young contested Middlesbrough, a safe seat for the Labour Party, and finished second to their incumbent MP, Andy McDonald. In the same year, Young was elected as the councillor for Coulby Newham ward on Middlesbrough Council. He was the first Conservative councillor since the formation of the council as a unitary authority in 1996. In February 2019, he announced that he would be standing down from his council seat as he no longer lived in the town, and had moved to Saltburn-by-the-Sea. In May 2019, he stood as a candidate for one of the three council seats for Saltburn ward on Redcar and Cleveland Borough Council. He finished a close fourth.

Young was selected as the Conservative candidate for Redcar at the 2019 general election on 11 November that year. He went on to be elected with a majority of 3,527 (8.7%), on a swing of 15.4% from Labour to the Conservatives. He is the first Conservative to represent the constituency. In a profile by GQ in February 2021, he was described as "socially liberal" and a "Thatcherite".

On 6 June 2022, after a vote of no confidence in the leadership of Boris Johnson was called, Young announced that he would be supporting Johnson as he felt that he had "got the big calls right" on Brexit, the COVID-19 pandemic and the war in Ukraine, and added that he believed Johnson "cares about Teesside, I believe, more than any prime minister has in history." Young resigned as Parliamentary Private Secretary for the Department for Levelling Up, Housing and Communities on 6 July 2022, as part of the July 2022 United Kingdom government crisis. He endorsed Rishi Sunak in the 2022 Conservative Party leadership election.

Personal life
Young married his partner on 8 April 2022. He is a Christian.

References

External links

Official website

1993 births
Living people
Alumni of Teesside University
UK MPs 2019–present
Conservative Party (UK) MPs for English constituencies
English LGBT politicians
LGBT members of the Parliament of the United Kingdom
People from Middlesbrough
Councillors in North East England
Conservative Party (UK) councillors
Gay politicians